Arpachshad ( – ʾArpaḵšaḏ, in pausa  – ʾArpaḵšāḏ;  – Arphaxád), alternatively spelled Arphaxad or Arphacsad, is one of the postdiluvian men in the ShemTerah genealogy. The name is recorded in the Book of Genesis in the Hebrew Bible (or Old Testament of Christian Bible) and subsequently copied in different biblical books, including the Gospel of Luke in the New Testament.

Biblical accounts
According to the Book of Genesis he was one of the five sons of Shem (the son of Noah). He is the twelfth name of the Genesis genealogy that traces Abrahams ancestry from Adam to Terah (cf. ). Beginning with Adam, nine Antediluvian names are given that predate Noah and the Flood, and nine postdiluvian, beginning with Noah's eldest son Shem and ending with Terah. 

According to the text, Arpachshad's brothers were Elam, Asshur, Lud and Aram. Arpachshad's son is called Selah, except in the Septuagint, where his son is Cainan, Shelah being Arpachshad's grandson. Cainan is also identified as Arpachshad's son in Luke  and in the non-canonical book of Jubilees 8:1. The Book of Jubilees additionally identifies Arpachshad's wife as Rasu'aya, the daughter of Susan, who was the son (or daughter in some versions) of Shem's older son Elam. (Arpachshad's mother is named in this source as Sedeqetelebab; for competing traditions on the name of Shem's wife see wives aboard the Ark.)

Identifications
Some ancient Jewish sources, particularly Jubilees, point to Arpachshad as the immediate progenitor of Ura and Kesed, who allegedly founded the city of Ur Kasdim (Ur of the Chaldees) on the west bank of the Euphrates (Jubilees 9:4; 11:1–7) – the same bank where Ur, identified by Leonard Woolley in 1927 as Ur of the Chaldees, is located.

Until Woolley's identification of Ur, Arpachshad was understood by many Jewish and Muslim scholars to be an area in northern Mesopotamia. This led to the identification of Arpachshad with Urfa-Kasid (due to similarities in the names  and ) – a land associated with the Khaldis, whom Josephus confused with the Chaldeans. Donald B. Redford asserted that Arpachshad is to be identified with Babylon.

Another person with the same name
Another Arpaxad is referenced in the deuterocanonical Book of Judith as a king of the Medes, and if this supposed Median king is contemporary with the conquest of the Assyrians, he could be identified with Phraortes (c. 665 - 633 BC). If he is contemporary with Nebuchadnezzar II (named as king of the Assyrians in Judith), he might be identified with Cyaxares (r. 625–585 BC).

References

Book of Genesis people
Shem
Noach (parashah)
Book of Jubilees